Oswald William Denison (29 June 1905 – 15 November 1990) was a New Zealand rower who won a bronze medal at the 1938 British Empire Games.

Early life and family
Born in the Auckland suburb of Ponsonby on 29 June 1905, Denison was the son of Walter Denison, a jeweller, and his wife Frances Denison (née Mitcham). He married Nellie Bristow on 5 October 1932 at the Grange Road Baptist Church in Mount Eden, and they went on to have five children.

Rowing
A member of the Waitemata Rowing Club, Denison was the stroke of the Auckland eight that finished third at the interprovincial eights championship in March 1937.

In May 1937, Denison was named as an emergency for the rowing squad to represent New Zealand at the 1938 British Empire Games, but was later confirmed as a member of the New Zealand eight. At the games, he rowed in the two seat, and won a bronze medal, with the New Zealand eight finishing in third, two lengths behind the second-placed Australian crew.

Competing at the same games, his father, Walter Denison, won a gold medal for New Zealand in lawn bowls men's pairs.

Later life and death
Denison died on 15 November 1990 at Houhora, and his ashes were buried at North Shore Memorial Park, Auckland. He had been predeceased by his wife in 1987.

References

1905 births
1990 deaths
New Zealand male rowers
Rowers at the 1938 British Empire Games
Commonwealth Games bronze medallists for New Zealand
Commonwealth Games medallists in rowing
Burials at North Shore Memorial Park
Rowers from Auckland
20th-century New Zealand people
Medallists at the 1938 British Empire Games